Roger Robinson ("Trey") Wright III (born April 1, 1974) is an American classical concert pianist.   He is also a Scrabble player who won the United States National Scrabble Championship in 2004.

Early life and musical training
Roger Wright was born in Houston, Texas, the son of Roger Wright, Jr., and Christy (Schmidt ) Wright.  He began piano study at age 12.  During high school he studied with Houston teacher John Weems.  At 18 Wright made his concerto debut with the Houston Symphony Orchestra.

Wright entered the piano program at the University of Houston, where he continued his studies with Nancy Weems, Ruth Tomfohrde, Abbey Simon, and Horacio Gutiérrez, and earned his Bachelor of Music degree.  During this time  he won second prize in the 1996 (U.S.) Music Teachers National Association Piano Competition, College Division.  Wright remained in Houston for graduate study, earning his Master of Music degree as a student of John Perry at Rice University's Shepherd School of Music; he would later do doctoral work with Perry at the University of Southern California in Los Angeles.

Piano career
Wright has been a prizewinner in several international competitions, including first prizes in the 1998 Frinna Awerbuch International Piano Competition and the 2003 San Antonio International Piano Competition. His performances in the 2000 Sydney International Piano Competition led to a debut recording with the Australian Broadcasting Corporation. He has performed as a soloist in North America, Australia, Europe, and Africa. He has issued several recordings (see "Discography").  Wright has been the featured performer on national radio broadcasts by ABC Australia and CBC Radio Canada, as well as local programs on 105.1 K-Mozart in Los Angeles and WQXR in New York City. He has appeared with numerous orchestras including the Houston Symphony, the Calgary Philharmonic, the San Antonio Symphony, Mission Chamber Orchestra, Glacier Symphony, and Brussels Chamber Orchestra. Critical praise for Wright's piano playing has appeared in publications including The Washington Post, Clavier, American Record Guide, and the Houston Chronicle.

In addition to his solo performances, Wright has toured internationally with the comedian harmonists Hudson Shad and appeared with them on PBS, and has co-produced a recording of Richard Strauss's Enoch Arden, a setting of Tennyson's poem for narrator and piano, collaborating with actor Michael York and pianist John Bell Young.
Wright currently resides in the Los Angeles, California, area, where he performs as a soloist, chamber musician, and accompanist, teaches both collegiately and privately, and composes.

Scrabble career
Wright began playing Scrabble at 17 and has competed in U.S. national tournaments (under his nickname, Trey Wright) since 1992. He won the $25,000 first prize in the National Scrabble Championship of the United States in 2004, defeating former champion David Gibson by winning the first three games in a best-of-five final.  During the 2004 finals a controversy arose as the result of a Scrabble play by Wright.  He placed the word "LEZ" (slang for lesbian) on the board but was compelled by tournament officials to retract the move and play a different word, because the finals were being run with a list of over a hundred forbidden words (allowed during the preliminary rounds), instituted as a precondition to ESPN's plan to televise the finals at a later date.  The incident was widely reported in the media, including on the BBC and in Slate.
As of January 2017, Wright ranked 13th in career money winnings, with $41,584.

Discography
Piano Masterpieces.  Music of Chopin, Debussy, Schumann, Liebermann, Rachmaninoff, Sculthorpe, Elisenda Fábregas, and Haydn. Eloquence 461 657–2. (2000). Radio airplay of one selection on this CD, Peter Sculthorpe's "Between Five Bells," earned Sculthorpe  the Australasian Performing Right Association’s (APRA) Award for the Most Performed Contemporary Classical Composition of 2001.
Enoch Arden by Richard Strauss and Alfred, Lord Tennyson, with Michael York, narrator, and John Bell Young, piano.  Co-produced by Wright. Americus Records AMR20021025. (2002)
Miniatures.  Music of Soler, Liebermann, Schumann, and William Mason. Wright Sounds. (2002)
Rzewski & Schubert. Music of Rzewski and Schubert. Wright Sounds. (2002)
Roger Wright in Concert. Music of Schumann, Haydn, Rzewski, and Schubert. Wright Sounds.  (2004)
Evocations. Music of J. S. Bach, Levitzki, Schubert, Chopin, Poulenc, and Liszt. Wright Sounds. (2007)
Piano Favorites. Music of Schumann, Soler, Mason, Chopin, and Schubert. Wright Sounds. (2009)
Rachmaninoff Piano Concerto No. 2. With the Orquesta Sinfónica Nacional de Costa Rica, conducted by Chosei Komatsu. Wright Sounds. (2010)
At the River. Music of Ravel, Rachmaninoff, Poulenc, Rzewski, and Balakirev. Wright Sounds. (2011)

References

External links
Roger Wright Official website
An interview with Roger Wright on Texas Public Radio, June 28, 2007.

American classical pianists
Male classical pianists
American male pianists
Musicians from Houston
Musicians from Los Angeles
1974 births
Living people
American Scrabble players
University of Houston alumni
Rice University alumni
Classical musicians from Texas
Classical musicians from California
21st-century classical pianists
21st-century American male musicians
21st-century American pianists